East Hawkesbury is a township in eastern Ontario, Canada, in the United Counties of Prescott and Russell. Situated on the Ottawa River, its eastern boundary is the border with the province of Quebec.

Communities
The township comprises the villages of Chute-à-Blondeau, Sainte-Anne-de-Prescott and Saint-Eugène. The township administrative offices are located in Saint-Eugène.

Demographics 

See also
List of townships in Ontario
List of francophone communities in Ontario

References

External links

 Official website

Lower-tier municipalities in Ontario
Municipalities in the United Counties of Prescott and Russell
Township municipalities in Ontario